Preserje pri Radomljah is a suburbanized settlement on the right bank of the Kamnik Bistrica River in the Municipality of Domžale in the Upper Carniola region of Slovenia.

Name
The name of the settlement was changed from Preserje to Preserje pri Radomljah in 1953.

References

External links
Preserje pri Radomljah on Geopedia

Populated places in the Municipality of Domžale